Saran Sérémé (born 17 November 1968, Ouagadougou) is a Burkinabé politician. Sérémé is a candidate for the Presidency in the country's 2015 election.  Sérémé is the head of the Party for Development and Change (PDC). Sérémé was previously a member of the Congress for Democracy and Progress party. She was also a businesswoman prior to entering politics.

References

Living people
1968 births